Grover Clifton "G. C." Spencer (July 9, 1925 – September 20, 2007) was a NASCAR driver who competed in 415 Grand National/Winston Cup Series races from 1958 to 1977. Despite never winning a race, he had 55 top-5 finishes and 138 top tens, including 7 second-place finishes.

Born in Owensboro, Kentucky, he was a dominant short-track racer in the 1940s and 1950s. He served in World War II with the U.S. Navy.

Spencer drove for his own independent team for most of his career, and was one of the most successful independents of the day. His best season came in 1965, when he finished fourth in points with 14 top-5 finishes and 25 top-10s and his only career pole. Although he drove GM and Chrysler cars for most of his career, he drove Fords in 1965, where he found most of his success.

He sold his team and equipment in 1983, and his No. 49 became the No. 4 of Morgan-McClure Motorsports. Spencer acted as the team manager to the team for its first three years.

He died in 2007 at the age of 82.

Motorsports career results

NASCAR
(key) (Bold – Pole position awarded by qualifying time. Italics – Pole position earned by points standings or practice time. * – Most laps led.)

Grand National Series

Winston Cup Series

Daytona 500

References

External links

 

1925 births
2007 deaths
United States Navy personnel of World War II
Deaths from emphysema
NASCAR drivers
Sportspeople from Owensboro, Kentucky
People from Jonesborough, Tennessee
Racing drivers from Kentucky
Racing drivers from Tennessee